The 10th Gujarat Legislative Assembly election was held in 1998. All 182 members of the Gujarat Legislative Assembly were elected with the leader of the largest party or coalition expected to become the next Chief Minister. The Bharatiya Janata Party took the majority despite winning fewer seats. Keshubhai Patel again became the Chief Minister of Gujarat.

Results

Elected members

References

1990s in Gujarat
State Assembly elections in Gujarat
Gujarat